A Shriek in the Night is a 1933 American pre-Code mystery crime film with elements of romance directed by Albert Ray and starring Ginger Rogers, Lyle Talbot, and Harvey Clark. It was produced by the independent studio Allied Pictures, and remains the company's best-known release.

Plot outline
Rival newspaper reporters Pat Morgan (Rogers) and Ted Rand (Talbot) find themselves unravelling the mystery behind the death of a millionaire philanthropist who fell from his penthouse balcony.  When it is discovered that the plunge was not an accident, the building's residents come under suspicion.  Soon, the body count begins to mount as three more murders occur by strangulation.

Cast
 Ginger Rogers as Pat Morgan
 Lyle Talbot as Ted Rand
 Harvey Clark as Peterson, the Janitor
 Purnell Pratt as Police Insp. Russell
 Lillian Harmer as Augusta, the Housekeeper
 Arthur Hoyt as Wilfred
 Louise Beavers as Maid 
 Clarence Wilson as Editor Perkins
 Maurice Black as Josephus Martini
 Jim Farley as Jim Brown, Detective
 Tiny Sandford as Eddie, Detective
 Philip Sleeman as Detective

See also
 List of films in the public domain in the United States

References

Bibliography
 Pitts, Michael R. Poverty Row Studios, 1929–1940. McFarland & Company, 2005.

External links

 
 
 

1933 films
1933 horror films
American black-and-white films
American comedy horror films
Films directed by Albert Ray
1930s comedy horror films
1933 comedy films
1930s English-language films
1930s American films